Enrique Mora Benavente (born October 15, 1958, in Córdoba) is a Spanish diplomat who has been serving as the Chief of Staff of Josep Borrell, High Representative for the Common Foreign and Security Policy of the European Union and as deputy secretary general of the European External Action Service (EEAS).

Career
A former member of the Spanish diplomatic service, Mora has been posted in Beirut, Cyprus and Helsinki, among others.

Since 2021, Mora has been the European Union envoy coordinating talks with Iran on reviving the Joint Comprehensive Plan of Action (JCPOA). In August 2021, he represented the EU at the inauguration of Ebrahim Raisi as President of Iran.

Mora is the author of several papers about the Balkan wars and crisis management.

Other activities
 European Council on Foreign Relations (ECFR), Member

References

Living people
1958 births
People from Córdoba, Spain